Mary May Purser (1913 - 1986) was an American painter. She is best known for her New Deal era mural in the Clarksville, Arkansas Post Office.

Biography
Purser nee  was born on August 16, 1901 in Chicago, Illinois. She attended the School of the Art Institute of Chicago. She married fellow artist Stuart R. Purser (1907 - 1986) with whom she had two children. Purser never graduated from the Art Institute, leaving at the time of her marriage, but she eventually earned a B.A. from the University of Mississippi, then an MFA from the University of Florida.

The Pursers moved several times as Stuart pursued his teaching career. They lived in Washington, Louisiana, Mississippi, Tennessee, and Florida, with Stuart serving as the head of the department of art at University of Florida. Mary taught for a time at the University of Tennessee at Chattanooga when the family resided there.

In 1939 Purser completed the oil-on-canvas mural How Happy Was the Occasion for the Clarksville, Arkansas Post Office. The mural was funded by the Treasury Section of Fine Arts (TSFA) and Purser received payment of $470.

She died in 1986 in Alachua, Florida.

References

External links
images of Mary M. Purser's art at Invaluable
image of the mural How Happy Was the Occasion

1913 births
1986 deaths
People from Chicago
American women painters
20th-century American painters
American muralists
20th-century American women artists
Women muralists